Juan Carlos Sulbaran (born November 9, 1989 in Willemstad, Curaçao) is a Dutch baseball player for L&D Amsterdam of the Honkbal Hoofdklasse and who has played for the Dutch national team. He throws a changeup, curveball and fastball (which peaks at around 90 mph). He played for Team Netherlands in the 2019 European Baseball Championship, at the Africa/Europe 2020 Olympic Qualification tournament, in Italy in September 2019.

Career
Sulbaran was voted the best pitcher in the 2004 Latin American Youth Baseball Tournament while playing for the Netherlands Antilles. He came to the United States in 2006 to play high school baseball. He missed most of 2007 because of an injury, though he struck out 24 in 12 innings. In 2008, he went 11-0 with a 1.40 ERA, striking out 88 in 67 innings and allowing 31 hits to help his team to a state championship. The Cincinnati Reds chose Sulbaran in the 30th round of the 2008 amateur draft (he was drafted late due to his commitment to the University of Florida) and was signed to a deal with the Reds on August 14, 2008, with a $500,000 signing bonus which was a record for the 30th round.

Sulbaran joined the Netherlands Antilles national baseball team for the 2008 Haarlem Baseball Week and got a no-decision against the Cuban national team. He allowed one hit and one run in 7 innings and struck out 6 but walked 7. The only run was a steal of home by Giorvis Duvergel. The performance earned him a spot on the Dutch squad for the 2008 Summer Olympics in Beijing. He was the only player on the team who had never appeared for the "Orange" before.

Sulbaran was traded from the Cincinnati Reds to the Kansas City Royals with Donnie Joseph for Jonathan Broxton.

He played for Team Netherlands in the 2019 European Baseball Championship, at the Africa/Europe 2020 Olympic Qualification tournament in Italy in September 2019, and at the 2019 WBSC Premier12.

References

External links

Sulbaran's profile at honkbalsite.com 

1989 births
2009 World Baseball Classic players
2015 WBSC Premier12 players
2017 World Baseball Classic players
2019 European Baseball Championship players
Bakersfield Blaze players
Baseball players at the 2008 Summer Olympics
Curaçao baseball players
Curaçao expatriate baseball players in Canada
Curaçao expatriate baseball players in the United States
Dayton Dragons players
Living people
Memphis Redbirds players
Northwest Arkansas Naturals players
Olympic baseball players of the Netherlands
Dutch baseball players
Omaha Storm Chasers players
Pensacola Blue Wahoos players
People from Willemstad
Springfield Cardinals players
Surprise Saguaros players
Wilmington Blue Rocks players
Tiburones de La Guaira players
Curaçao expatriate baseball players in Venezuela
Winnipeg Goldeyes players
2023 World Baseball Classic players